Jo Wheeler (born 3 July 1963, Manchester) is an English weather forecaster who currently works for Sky News.

Early life
Wheeler's father and uncle worked in the broadcasting industry. From 1974–79 she attended Wilmslow County Grammar School for Girls, which became comprehensive in 1978, and became part of Wilmslow High School. From 1979–81 she went to the independent Cheadle Hulme School for her sixth-form. She spent a short time at Manchester Drama School, but did not complete her course.

Career

ITV 
Before joining Sky, Wheeler had spells working for Central East Television as a continuity announcer from 1983 at Lenton Lane Studios, later Carlton Studios, Nottingham. From January 1987 to November 1988 she worked with Orion Airways at Castle Donington.

BBC
She joined East Midlands Today as one of its first weather presenters when it was launched in 1991. She presented the afternoon weekend programme on Radio Lincolnshire from 1988–93.

Sky News
She joined BSkyB in October 1994 where she also presented forecasts for Channel 5 until February 2012. She was also voted Best European Weather Presenter in 1998.

She lived in Portugal for a seven-year period with her husband and five children, and commuted to the UK-based Sky News Centre in Isleworth on a weekly basis to present the weather. Because of this, she acted as a live reporter in Praia da Luz during the initial coverage of the disappearance of Madeleine McCann before journalists arrived from London.

In 2010, Sky News carried out a major overhaul of its presentation, removing most of its weather presenters Wheeler now works freelance.

Personal life
Wheeler married Richard Edwards in April 2000 in Cheshire. They moved from Wilmslow to Portugal in 2002, and have had a daughter (born July 1999) and son (born November 2001) together. Jo has two daughters (born November 1990 and June 1994) and a son (born January 1992) from a previous relationship.

She now lives in Wainfleet, Lincolnshire.

See also
 1963 in British television

References

External links
 Going the distance Times Online, 2 September 2007
 Miles better Telegraph, 6 October 2007
 
 Joanne Wheeler – Q and A TV Newsroom

BBC weather forecasters
English expatriates in Portugal
Living people
1963 births
People educated at Cheadle Hulme School
People from East Lindsey District
People from Wilmslow
Radio and television announcers
Sky News weather forecasters
People from Twickenham